The Turk Jamat are a Muslim community found in India. They claim they are descended from the various Turkic tribes that settled in the region. Many members of the community migrated to Pakistan after India's independence and subsequent partition, settling in Karachi.

Göktürk wave (5th-8th c.)

Turkic dynasties
The community had traditionally served as soldiers in the armies of the various Turkic dynasties which ruled Indian subcontinent. They were and still are a community of small to medium-sized farmers. A good many are also traders. Like other Gujarati Muslims, they have a caste association known as the Jamat, which acts both as a welfare organization and an instrument of social control.

Present circumstances

The Turks live in northern India, mainly in Delhi, Gaziabad, Amroha, Moradabad, Rampur, Sambhal, Bijnor, Muzaffarnagar and Meerut in Uttar Pradesh, Udhamsingh Nagar, Nainital, Haldwani and Dehradun in Uttrakhand, Bhopal and Junagarh in Gujarat. The region has 40 to 55% Muslim electorate. They upset electoral calculations in five Parliament and 27 provincial Assembly constituencies in uttar Pradesh.

The community had traditionally served as soldiers in the armies of the various princely states in the Kathiawar Agency. They are also good traders Like other Gujarati Muslims, they have a caste association known as the Jamat, which acts both as a welfare organization and an instrument of social control.

References

Muslim communities of India
Indian people of Turkic descent